Tresa Hughes (September 17, 1929 – July 24, 2011) was an American stage, film, and television actress. She was nominated for Tony Award for Best Featured Actress in a Play in 1961 for her role in The Devil's Advocate. Her film and television credits included Don Juan DeMarco, Fame, and Another World.

Life and career
Hughes was born in Washington, D.C. and graduated in 1947 from Forest Park High School. She attended the Maryland Art Institute and Johns Hopkins University and George Washington University before graduating from Wayne State University. She made her Broadway debut in the 1959 production of The Miracle Worker as actress Anne Bancroft's understudy in the role of Annie Sullivan.

Hughes enjoyed a Broadway career which spanned more than 30 years. Her Broadway credits included Dear Me, the Sky is Falling in 1963, The Advocate in 1963, The Last Analysis in 1964, Spofford in 1967, The Man in the Glass Booth in 1968, Beggar on Horseback in 1970, The Prisoner of Second Avenue in 1971, Golda in 1977, Tribute in 1978, The American Clock in 1980, Lolita in 1981, Woody Allen's The Floating Light Bulb in 1981, and Cafe Crown in 1989.

Hughes' movie credits included roles in Coming Home in 1978, Fame in 1980, Bad Medicine in 1985, Grandma DeMarco in the 1995 film Don Juan DeMarco, and A Fish in the Bathtub in 1999. Her television roles included NYPD Blue, Wonderland, Ed and several castings on Law & Order.

Death
Tresa Hughes died on July 21, 2011 in New York City, aged 81. She was survived by her daughter Rebecca and grandson William.

Filmography

References

External links

1929 births
2011 deaths
American stage actresses
American film actresses
American television actresses
Actresses from New York City
Actresses from Washington, D.C.
21st-century American women